The Simandou mine is a large iron mine located in the Simandou mountain range of southern Guinea's Nzérékoré Region. Simandou represents one of the largest iron ore reserves in Guinea and in the world, having estimated reserves of 2.4 billion tonnes of ore grading 65% iron metal.

The Pic de Fon and Ouéléba iron deposits are located approximately 4 km from one another at the southern end of the Simandou Range, approximately 550 km ESE of the capital, Conakry. Both deposits are approximately 7.5 km in length and up to 1 km wide. At both banded iron formations (metamorphosed to staurolite-grade itabirites) have been enriched to form haematite and haematite-goethite mineralisations. The potential yield of the two deposits is estimated at 2.25 billion tonnes of high-grade iron ore.

Corruption and controversy 
The Simandou mine has known much turmoil and many mining rights disputes over the years. In 2008 Rio Tinto Group, the licensee of the Simandou concession, was ordered by the Guinean government to relinquish the northern half (Blocks 1 and 2, east and southeast of Kérouané) to BSGR (Beny Steinmetz Group Resources), a company controlled by the Israeli diamond investor Beny Steinmetz.

In March 2010 Rio Tinto and its biggest shareholder, Aluminum Corporation of China Limited (Chinalco), signed a preliminary agreement to develop Rio Tinto's iron ore project.

On April 14, 2013, Frederic Cilins, an agent for Beny Steinmetz's company, was arrested in Jacksonville, Florida, as a result of an FBI investigation that began in January 2013. The investigation aimed to establish whether potential illegal payments made to obtain mining concessions in Guinea had been transferred to the United States in breach of the Foreign Corrupt Practices Act, which allows U.S. officials to pursue bribery cases abroad. Cilin's detention followed covert FBI recordings of a series of meetings that allegedly showed he had plotted the destruction of documents which it is claimed could have shown the Simandou exploitation rights were acquired following the payment of millions of dollars in bribes to Guinea government officials.

Cilins pleaded guilty in March 2014 and was sentenced to 2 years in jail. No charges were brought against Steinmetz or BSGR.

Back in 2010, BSGR sold 51% of their stake to Vale (NYSE:VALE) for $2.5 billion. However, after Vale had paid in $500 million, the government of Guinea led by President Alpha Condé launched an investigation into the legality of BSGR's license. In April 2014 the Guinean government cancelled BSGR's mining rights in Simandou, and in May 2014 BSGR sought arbitration over the government's decision to expropriate the company's mining rights. During the same month Rio Tinto filed suit against Vale and BSGR over the validity of their mining license. BSGR denied any wrongdoing and the lawsuit was dismissed in 2015 in the US. In November 2016, BSGR filed suit against Rio Tinto for compensation.

In 2014, Vale filed a claim against BSGR at the London Court of International Arbitration to recover an upfront payment to BSGR and money it invested in Guinea. The court decided in favor of Vale and awarded it $2 billion. In May 2020, BSGR filed discovery request documents at the court in New York based on transcripts of conversations with former Vale executives that were obtained by the Black Cube private intelligence company.  BSGR claims that the documents prove that Vale was aware of potential problems with how the rights to develop Simandou had been obtained, but chose to ignore them and proceeded to buy 51% of the iron-ore licenses. This could undermine Vale’s claims to compensation.

In February 2019, BSGR came to an agreement with Guinea to withdraw the mutual corruption allegations as well as the arbitration case. The agreement made BSGR surrender its rights to Simandou but allowed it to maintain an interest in the smaller Zogota deposit while giving Mick Davis, the head of Niron Metals, permission to develop it.

In 2016, former Guinean mining minister Mahmoud Thiam accused the head of Rio Tinto's Guinea operation department, Steven Din, of offering him a bribe in 2010 with the aim of regaining Rio Tinto's control over half of the undeveloped Simandou project.

During the same month the company agreed to sell their remaining 46.6% stake in the mine to Aluminum Corporation of China Limited (Chinalco) for $1.3 billion. President Condé denied knowing about the bribe. However, according to recordings presented by FRANCE 24, Guinean authorities knew about the Simandou briberies by Rio Tinto.

In 2017, the Serious Fraud Office (SFO), Britain's anti-fraud regulator, launched an official investigation into Rio Tinto's business and mining practices in Guinea. Investigations into the Group's activity in Simandou were also launched by Australian authorities and the US Department of Justice.

Production 
Mining operations were expected to start before the end of 2015.  Rio Tinto Limited plans to build a 650 km railway to transport iron ore from the mine to the coast, near Matakong, for export.  Much of the Simandou iron ore is expected to be shipped to China for steel production.

Despite assurances, the mine is still not operational. The mine is expected to produce up to 95 MTpa of ore.

See also

Mining industry of Guinea

References 

Iron mines in Guinea